Jalea is a Peruvian cuisine dish consisting of fried fish, squid, and other seafood.

References

Peruvian cuisine